Irakli Revishvili (born November 3, 1989) is a Georgian swimmer, who specialized in freestyle events. He represented his nation Georgia at the 2008 Summer Olympics, and has currently owned two Georgian national records in both the 200 and 400 m freestyle. Revishvili also trained for the national swimming team under the tutelage of head coach and 2004 Olympian Zurab Khomasuridze.

Revishvili received a card invitation from FINA to compete as a lone Georgian male swimmer in the 200 m freestyle at the 2008 Summer Olympics in Beijing. He pulled away from a small field of swimmers to take victory in the opening heat with 1:53.60, but failed to advance further to the semifinals, finishing fifty-third overall in the prelims.

References

External links
NBC Olympics Profile

1989 births
Living people
Male freestyle swimmers from Georgia (country)
Olympic swimmers of Georgia (country)
Swimmers at the 2008 Summer Olympics
Swimmers at the 2016 Summer Olympics
Sportspeople from Tbilisi
Swimmers at the 2020 Summer Olympics